MJM Australia is an Australian importer/wholesaler of games, jigsaws, playing cards, wooden toys, board games, traditional games and puzzles. It was originally a publisher of original games and Australian editions of overseas wargames.

References

External links

Game manufacturers
Manufacturing companies based in Melbourne
Entertainment companies of Australia
Cheltenham, Victoria
Family-owned companies of Australia
Playing card manufacturers
Australian games